The Dautreuil House, at 517 E. Bridge St. in St. Martinville, Louisiana, was built around 1840.  It was listed on the National Register of Historic Places in 1995.

It is a one-story brick house, with brick laid in common bond, with Creole and Greek Revival influences.

It has been operated as the La Maison Louie Bed and Breakfast.

References

National Register of Historic Places in St. Martin Parish, Louisiana
Greek Revival architecture in Louisiana
Houses completed in 1840